Florian Hrebnicki (born as Franciszek Hrebnicki; ; 1683 – 18 July 1762) was the "Metropolitan of Kiev, Galicia and all Ruthenia"

On 14 March 1716 Hrebnicki was ordained by Primate of the Uniate church Leo Kiszka as a archbishop of Polock.

On 16 December 1748 he was confirmed as the Metropolitan bishop of Kiev, Galicia, and all Ruthenia.

He consecrated following bishops Maksymilian Rylo and Theodosius Godebski.

Hrebnicki died in 1762 at a residence of the Polotsk Archbishops that he built in village of Strunie (today in Polotsk District).

Notelist

References 
 Florian Hrebnicki at the catholic-hierarchy.org
 Sas, P. Florian Hrebnicki (ГРЕБНИЦЬКИЙ ФЛОРІЯН МИХАЙЛОВИЧ). Encyclopedia of History of Ukraine. 2004

1683 births
1762 deaths
People from Vitebsk Voivodeship
Ruthenian nobility of the Polish–Lithuanian Commonwealth
Metropolitans of Kiev, Galicia and all Ruthenia (Holy See)
Order of Saint Basil the Great
Uniate archbishops of Polotsk